Abu Yuru (also Romanized as Abū Yūrū and Abū Yowrū) is a village in Gheyzaniyeh Rural District, in the Central District of Ahvaz County, Khuzestan Province, Iran. At the 2006 census, its population was 200, in 23 families.

References 

Populated places in Ahvaz County